Starstruck is a British television talent series that has aired on ITV since 12 February 2022. It features a singing contest in which members of the public impersonate showbiz stars. The series is presented by Olly Murs with a judging panel, in the first series, consisting of Adam Lambert, Beverley Knight, Jason Manford and Sheridan Smith. For Series 2, airing in 2023, Smith was swapped for Shania Twain due to Smith's other filming commitments. The series is described by some media outlets as a revived and reformatted version of Stars in Their Eyes.

Background and history
In March 2020, it was reported that ITV would replace The X Factor with a second revival/reformat  of Stars in Their Eyes later in the year, however this time with a celebrity panel of judges. In December 2020, new reports suggested that ITV would revive the show in Autumn 2021, under the new name of Starstruck, with Sheridan Smith, Adam Lambert, Beverley Knight and Jason Manford as judges. In April 2021, it was reported that Olly Murs would host the show. It began filming that month at ITV Studios Bovingdon, and was expected to air that summer. In August, ITV previewed Starstruck at the Edinburgh International Television Festival and in October, it was confirmed that the series would air in 2022.

The show was finally scheduled for broadcast in February 2022, with the change to the format being that three 'tribute artists' will perform at the same time as each other, with four different music acts covered each week. Six 75 minute programmes were ordered by the network along with a 90 minute final which saw the winner take home a £50,000 prize. The first series was won by Rachael Hawnt performing as Cher.

In April 2022, ITV announced that Starstruck would be returning for a second season with the same judging panel. However in August 2022, it was confirmed that Smith would not be returning as a judge for the second series due to schedule conflicts and filming commitments. On 30 August 2022, Shania Twain announced via her Instagram channel that she would join series 2 as a judge. This was confirmed by ITV the next day. The second series began airing on 18 February 2023 on ITV1 and ITVX, and was filmed in September 2022 at ITV Studios Bovingdon. Ronan Keating was a guest judge in place of Twain, who was absent due to schedule conflicts, for two episodes.

Series overview

Series 1 (2022)

Episode 1 (12 February)

Sing-off

Episode 2 (19 February)

Sing-off

Episode 3 (26 February)

Sing-off

Episode 4 (5 March)

Sing-off

Episode 5 (12 March)

Sing-off

Episode 6 (26 March)

Sing-off

Final (2 April)

Series 2 (2023)
The second series began on 18 February 2023. Shania Twain was not on the panel for 2 episodes this series so her seat was taken by Boyzone's Ronan Keating.

Episode 1 (18 February)
Group Performance: Olly Murs & The Starstruck Judges - "(I Can't Get No) Satisfaction"

Sing-off

Episode 2 (25 February)

Sing-off

Episode 3 (4 March) 
Guest Performance: Adam Lambert - "Ordinary World"

Sing-off

Episode 4 (11 March) 
Guest Performance: Beverley Knight - "Rock Steady"

Sing-off

Episode 5 (18 March) 
Guest Judge: Ronan Keating

Sing-off

Ratings
Official ratings are taken from BARB.

International versions

References

External links
 
 

2020s British television series
2022 British television series debuts
2020s British music television series
British music television shows
English-language television shows
ITV reality television shows
Singing talent shows
Television series by Banijay